Korzeń may refer to the following places in Poland:
Korzeń, Łódź Voivodeship (central Poland)
Korzeń, Masovian Voivodeship (east-central Poland)

See also
 
Korzen (disambiguation)